Robert "Robbie" Buttigieg (27 November 1936 – 11 February 2004) was a Maltese football defender who played for Sliema Wanderers and represented Malta at international level. A one-club man, he captained Sliema Wanderers and later managed the club.

Personal life 
Buttigieg's son, John, was also a footballer and won 97 caps for the Malta national football team.

References

1936 births
Maltese footballers
Maltese Premier League players
Malta international footballers
2004 deaths
Association football defenders
Sliema Wanderers F.C. players
Sliema Wanderers F.C. managers
Maltese football managers